In mathematics, a conservative system is a dynamical system which stands in contrast to a dissipative system. Roughly speaking, such systems have no friction or other mechanism to dissipate the dynamics, and thus, their phase space does not shrink over time. Precisely speaking, they are those dynamical systems that have a null wandering set: under time evolution, no portion of the phase space ever "wanders away", never to be returned to or revisited. Alternately, conservative systems are those to which the  Poincaré recurrence theorem applies. An important special case of conservative systems are the measure-preserving dynamical systems.

Informal introduction
Informally, dynamical systems describe the time evolution of the phase space of some mechanical system. Commonly, such evolution is given by some differential equations, or quite often in terms of discrete time steps.  However, in the present case, instead of focusing on the time evolution of discrete points, one shifts attention to the time evolution of collections of points. One such example would be Saturn's rings: rather than tracking the time evolution of individual grains of sand in the rings, one is instead interested in the time evolution of the density of the rings: how the density thins out, spreads, or becomes concentrated. Over short time-scales (hundreds of thousands  of years), Saturn's rings are stable, and are thus a reasonable example of a conservative system and more precisely, a measure-preserving dynamical system. It is measure-preserving, as the number of particles in the rings does not change, and, per Newtonian orbital mechanics, the phase space is incompressible: it can be stretched or squeezed, but not shrunk (this is the content of Liouville's theorem).

Formal definition
Formally, a measurable dynamical system is conservative if and only if it is non-singular, and has no wandering sets.

A measurable dynamical system (X, Σ, μ, τ) is a Borel space (X, Σ) equipped with a sigma-finite measure μ and a transformation τ. Here, X is a set, and Σ is a sigma-algebra on X, so that the pair (X, Σ) is a measurable space. μ is a sigma-finite measure on the sigma-algebra. The space X is the phase space of the dynamical system.

A transformation (a map)  is said to be Σ-measurable if and only if, for every σ ∈ Σ, one has . The transformation is a single "time-step" in the evolution of the dynamical system. One is interested in invertible transformations, so that the current state of the dynamical system came from a well-defined past state.

A measurable transformation  is called non-singular when  if and only if . In this case, the system (X, Σ, μ, τ) is called a non-singular dynamical system. Non-singular dynamical systems are suitable for modeling non-equilibrium systems. That is, if a certain configuration of the system is "impossible" (i.e. ) then it stays "impossible", but otherwise, the system can evolve arbitrarily. Non-singular systems preserve the negligible sets, but are not required to preserve any other class of sets.

A non-singular dynamical system is conservative if, for every set  of positive measure and for every , one has some integer  such that . Informally, this can be interpreted as saying that the current state of the system revisits or comes arbitrarily close to a prior state; see Poincaré recurrence for more.

A non-singular transformation  is incompressible if, whenever one has , then .

Properties 
For a non-singular transformation , the following statements are equivalent:
 τ is conservative.
 τ is incompressible.
 Every wandering set of τ is null.
 For all sets σ of positive measure, .

The above implies that all measure-preserving dynamical systems are conservative. This is effectively the modern statement of the Poincaré recurrence theorem.  A sketch of the proof of the equivalence of these four is given at Hopf decomposition#Recurrence theorem.

Hopf decomposition

The Hopf decomposition states that every measure space with a non-singular transformation can be decomposed into an invariant conservative set and a wandering (dissipative) set. A commonplace informal example of Hopf decomposition is the mixing of two liquids (some textbooks mention rum and coke): The initial state, where the two liquids are not yet mixed, can never recur again after mixing; it is part of the dissipative set. Likewise any of the partially-mixed states. The result, after mixing (a cuba libre, in the canonical example), is stable, and forms the conservative set; further mixing does not alter it. In this example, the conservative set is also ergodic: if one added one more drop of liquid (say, lemon juice), it would not stay in one place, but would come to mix in everywhere. One word of caution about this example: although mixing systems are ergodic, ergodic systems are not in general mixing systems! Mixing implies an interaction which may not exist. The canonical example of an ergodic system that does not mix is the Bernoulli process: it is the set of all possible infinite sequences of coin flips (equivalently, the set  of infinite strings of zeros and ones); each individual coin flip is independent of the others.

Ergodic decomposition
The ergodic decomposition theorem states, roughly, that every conservative system can be split up into components, each component of which is individually ergodic. An informal example of this would be a tub, with a divider down the middle, with liquids filling each compartment. The liquid on one side can clearly mix with itself, and so can the other, but, due to the partition, the two sides cannot interact. Clearly, this can be treated as two independent systems; leakage between the two sides, of measure zero, can be ignored. The ergodic decomposition theorem states that all conservative systems can be split into such independent parts, and that this splitting is unique (up to differences of measure zero). Thus, by convention, the study of conservative systems becomes the study of their ergodic components.

Formally, every ergodic system is conservative. Recall that an invariant set σ ∈ Σ is one for which τ(σ) = σ. For an ergodic system, the only invariant sets are those with measure zero or with full measure (are null or are conull); that they are conservative then follows trivially from this.

When τ is ergodic, the following statements are equivalent:
 τ is conservative and ergodic
 For all measurable sets σ, ; that is, σ "sweeps out" all of X.
 For all sets σ of positive measure, and for almost every , there exists a positive integer n such that .
 If , then either  or the complement has zero measure: .

See also
 KMS state, a description of thermodynamic equilibrium in quantum mechanical systems; dual to modular theories for von Neumann algebras.

Notes

References

Further reading 
 
 

Ergodic theory
Dynamical systems